Dietzia papillomatosis is a bacterium from the genus Dietzia which has been isolated from the skin scrapings of a patient in the United Kingdom.

References

Further reading

External links
Type strain of Dietzia papillomatosis at BacDive -  the Bacterial Diversity Metadatabase	

Mycobacteriales
Bacteria described in 2008